The United States competed at the 1908 Summer Olympics in London, England. During the opening ceremony, American athletes did not dip their flag to the British royalty in support of the Irish boycott over Great Britain's refusal to grant Irish independence.

Medalists

Results by event

Archery

The United States had one archer present in 1908.  The 19-year-old Richardson had already won an Olympic bronze medal, in the team event at the 1904 Summer Olympics.  He competed in both events open to men, taking the bronze medal in the York rounds and 15th place in the Continental style.

Athletics

American track & field athletes continued to dominate the sport, taking more than twice as many championships as the next most successful nation, host Great Britain.

Running

Jumping

Throwing

Cycling

Diving

The Americans sent two divers in 1908.  Gaidzik made it to the finals in both diving events, after a successful protest in the platform competition.  He won a bronze medal in the springboard after tying with the third-place German diver.

Figure skating

Jeu de paume

In the jeu de paume competition, Gould won the gold medal while Sands was eliminated in the first round by the eventual silver medallist.

Shooting

Swimming

Tug of war

Wrestling

Notes

Sources
 
 

Nations at the 1908 Summer Olympics
1908
Olympics